La mamma is the eleventh French studio album by the French singer Charles Aznavour, released in 1963. It achieved TOP1 in France for several weeks, Spain (also TOP1), it was a TOP10 hit in Belgium, Holland, and other countries. It became a bestseller, and sold over a million copies only in France. The English version of 'La Mamma' entitled 'For Mama', was written in 1964, with words by Don Black and became a hit in Philippines. In the US Ray Charles performed it.

The album includes songs by Charles Aznavour, Georges Garvarentz and others.

It was reissued in 1995 by EMI.

Track listing  
La mamma (Charles Aznavour / Robert Gall)
Si tu m'emportes (Charles Aznavour)
Je T'Attends (Charles Aznavour)
Sylvie (Charles Aznavour)
Et Pourtant (Charles Aznavour / Georges Garvarentz)
Les Aventuriers (Charles Aznavour / Jacques Plante)
Tu veux (Charles Aznavour)
Le temps des caresses (Charles Aznavour)

Track listing of the 1995 CD Reissue 
La mamma (Charles Aznavour / Robert Gall)
Si tu m'emportes (Charles Aznavour)
Je T'Attends (Charles Aznavour)
Sylvie (Charles Aznavour)
Et Pourtant (Charles Aznavour / Georges Garvarentz)
Les Aventuriers (Charles Aznavour / Jacques Plante)
Tu veux (Charles Aznavour)
Le temps des caresses (Charles Aznavour)
Ne Dis Rien (Charles Aznavour)
Poker (Charles Aznavour / Pierre Roche)
Sur Ma Vie (Charles Aznavour)
Plus Bleu Que Tes Yeux (Charles Aznavour)
Merci Mon Dieu (Charles Aznavour)
Moi J'Fais Mon Rond (Charles Aznavour / Gaby Wagenheim)
J'Aime Paris au mois de mai (Charles Aznavour / Pierre Roche)
Ton beau visage (Charles Aznavour)
Vivre avec toi (Charles Aznavour)
Si je n'avais plus (Charles Aznavour)

Personnel 
Charles Aznavour - Author, Composer, Vocals
Raoul Breton - Text
Robert Gall - Composer
Georges Garvarentz - Composer
Andre Gornet - Photography
Herman Leonard - Photography
Paul Mauriat - Orchestration
Jacques Plante - Lyricist
Pierre Roche - Composer
Lévon Sayan - Artistic Consultation, Photography
Gaby Wagenheim - Composer

References

Links
La mamma (live)

1963 albums
Charles Aznavour albums